Edmund Carroll Jaeger, D.Sc., (January 28, 1887 – August 2, 1983) was an American biologist known for his works on desert ecology. He was born in Loup City, Nebraska to Katherine (née Gunther) and John Philip Jaeger, and moved to Riverside, California in 1906 with his family. He was the first to document, in The Condor, a state of extended torpor, approaching hibernation, in a bird, the common poorwill. He also described this in the National Geographic Magazine.

Life
Jaeger first attended the newly relocated Occidental College in Eagle Rock, Los Angeles (in 1914), but moved to Palm Springs in 1915, where he taught at the one-room schoolhouse. At Palm Springs he met artist Carl Eytel, and authors J. Smeaton Chase and Charles Francis Saunders. These men formed what University of Arizona Professor Peter Wild called a "Creative Brotherhood" that lived in Palm Springs in the early 20th century. Other Brotherhood members included cartoonist and painter Jimmy Swinnerton, author George Wharton James, and photographers Fred Payne Clatworthy and Stephen H. Willard. The men lived near each other (like Jaeger, Eytel built his own cabin), traveled together throughout the Southwest, helped with each other's works, and exchanged photographs which appeared in their various books. He then returned to Occidental to complete his degree in 1918 and started teaching at Riverside Junior College. Retiring from teaching after 30 years, he worked the Riverside Municipal Museum in Riverside. During all these years Jaeger used his Palm Springs cabin for his research trips across the desert. Throughout his career he wrote many popular nature books and became known as the "dean of the California deserts".

Works

Books
(Listed in order of first publication.)
 
 
 
 
 
 
  (Samuel Stillman Berry and Malcom Jennings Rogers contributed chapters)
 
  (illustrations by Merle Gish and the author)
 
  (Irvine H. Page was a co-author)
  (editor)
 
  (Peveril Meigs contributed a chapter; illustrations by John D. Briggs, Lloyd Mason Smith, Morris Van Dame, and Jaeger )
  (illustrations by Morris Van Dame and Jaeger)
 
  (Arthur Clayton Smith was a co-author; illustrations by Gene M. Christman)

Articles
Jaeger contributed to over 25 magazines and journals including:

 The Advent Review and Sabbath Herald
 The Auk
 Cactus and Succulent Journal
 Calico Print
 The Condor
 Desert Magazine
 Fremontia
 Journal of Mammalogy
 National Geographic Magazine
 Pacific Union Recorder
 St. Nicholas Magazine
 The Youth's Instructor

History of Palm Springs

Archives of Jaeger's work
 Much of Jaeger's original work is archived at the University of California, Riverside, Library Special Collections.
 Also see:  (Summary: biographical material, list of publications, newspapers articles and correspondence of Edmund C. Jaeger, Head of the Zoology Dept. at Riverside City College. 358 items in one box)

Honors
 The "Edmund C. Jaeger Desert Institute" on the Moreno Valley College (MVC) of the Riverside Community College District is named in his honor. MCV also offers an "Edmund C. Jaeger Endowed Scholarship".
 In 1986 The Nature Conservancy completed development of the "Edmund C. Jaeger Nature Sanctuary" in the Chuckwalla Mountains near Desert Center, California. It was in the Chuckwalla Mountains that Jaeger discovered the poorwill, and after his death in 1983, his cremated remains were scattered in the same canyon.
 The University of La Verne of La Verne, California, Cultural and Natural History Collections (formerly the Jaeger Museum), maintains personal and professional materials pertaining to the life of Edmund C. Jaeger, including his 1947 field notes recording his initial study of the common poorwill in hibernation. The Collections is located inside the Jaeger House, named in his honor.
 Pacific Union College of Angwin, California, annually presents an "Edmund C. Jaeger Award" in biology and "Dr. Edmund C. Jaeger Scholarship Grant" in education to deserving students.
 Designated as a Fellow of the California Native Plant Society in 1976.
 Received the Auld Lang Syne Award from Occidental College in 1982.

Patronyms
Some 28 patronyms of Jaeger have been made, including:

 Angiospermae (flowering plants)
 Monocotyledon (single cotyledon (seed-leaf))
 Yucca brevifolia – subspecies jaegeriana (the Jaeger Joshua tree)
 Dicotyledons (two cotyledons (seed-leaves))
 Astragalus jaegerianus (Lane Mountain milkvetch)
 Astragalus pachypus – variety jaegeri (Jaeger's bush milkvetch)
 Caulostramina jaegeri – synonyms: Thelypodium jaegeri and Hesperidanthus jaegeri (cliffdweller)
 Draba jaegeri (a variety of whitlow-grass)
 Eriogonum nodosum – variety jaegeri (wild buckwheat)
 Eriogonum plumatella – variety jaegeri (yucca buckwheat)
 Euphorbia jaegeri (Orocopia Mountain spurge)
 Gilia jaegeri (gilia)
 Helianthus jaegeri – synonym Helianthus annuus – subspecies jaegeri (sunflower)
 Ivesia jaegeri (Jaeger's mousetail or Jaeger's ivesia)
 Lupinus jaegerianus (lupin or lupines)
 Penstemon thompsoniae – subspecies jaegeri (Jaeger's beardtongue)
 Phacelia perityloides – subspecies jaegeri (Panamint Phacelia)
 Potentilla jaegeri (a typical cinquefoil)
 Ribes nevadense – variety jaegeri (Sierra currant and mountain pink currant)
 Sisymbrium diffusus – subspecies jaegeri (mustard family)

 Insecta
 Hemiptera (true bugs)
 Nidicola jaegeri (minute pirate bugs or flower bugs)
 Triatoma rubida jaegeri (a type of assassin bug)
 Lepidoptera (moths and butterflies)
 Schinia jaegeri – synonym Chlorocleptria jaegeri (moth)
 Diplopoda (millipedes)
 Gosichelus jaegeri
 Onychelus jaegeri
 Mollusca
 Pulmonata (land snails)
 Helminthoglypta jaegeri
 Oreohelix handi jaegeri

References

Further reading
 
 
  (Photography by Walter Meayers Edwards; foreword by Jaeger)

External links
 Edmund Jaeger site
 Riverside (California) Metropolitan Museum
 
 Edmund C Jaeger Nature Sanctuary USGS Desert Center Quad, California, Topographic Map at TopoZone
 
 

American ecologists
American naturalists
American nature writers
American male non-fiction writers
American science writers
Writers from Los Angeles
People from Loup City, Nebraska
Writers from Palm Springs, California
Writers from Riverside, California
Writers from Nebraska
1887 births
1983 deaths
20th-century naturalists